Pozhichalur (also commonly spelled as Polichalur) is a census town in Chennai metropolitan city in the Indian state of Tamil Nadu. It is a suburb of Chennai and is located close to the Chennai Airport at Tirusulam on its south west side. It lies on the south banks of the Adyar River. Agasteeswarar Temple, which is called North Thirunallaru, is situated there. The neighborhood is served by Pallavaram Railway Station of the Chennai Suburban Railway Network.

Demographics
The Chennai Metro railway station at Airport is very close to Pozhichalur within distance of 3 km.
 India census, Pozhichalur had a population of 15,329. Males constitute 51% of the population and females 49%. Pozhichalur has an average literacy rate of 78%, higher than the national average of 59.5%: male literacy is 84%, and female literacy is 73%. In Pozhichalur, 11% of the population is under 6 years of age.

History
Pozhichalur is the short, convenient, modern name for what was once called Pugazh Chola Nalloor (meaning Famous town of the Chola Kingdom, in Tamil). This town was created in the 9th century CE by the Cholas, who gave the town its most recognisable landmark, the Agastheeswarar Temple. Till 1997 'Thaangal' (kuttai/a small pond) was one of the important spots in this village; It homed the migratory birds during the rainy seasons; encroachment led to its disappearance. Of late Pozhichalur has become popular for cinema shooting; some scenes for films 'Vettaikaran','Villu', 'Penn Singam', 'Aezhaam Arivu','3','Maaya','Mampattiyan','Komban','AAA'...etc. have been shot in a place called Indraesan Garden located close to the Adyar river.

Religion and culture

Temples
Pozhichalur Agastheeswarar Temple (Vada Thirunallaaru, Saneeswarar Temple only one temple in North Tamil Nadu) is about 800 years old and has a big pond on the western side of the temple. This Tamil Nadu temple is called as Agastheeswarar temple as Agasthiyar is said to have worshipped Shiva here on his return from Himalayas, the Amman is called as Anandavalli. Pallavaram Railway station is the nearest railhead.

The temple enshrines Agastheeswarar as the presiding deity along with his divine consort Anandavalli. The sanctum of the Lord faces east and that of his consort faces south. Though Agastheeswarar Temple doesn't match to the grandeur of the ancient Chola temples, the architecture style denotes that the temple belongs to 12th century. The style of construction with the Gaja-Brashta-Vimana (resembling the shape of an elephant's behind) and the stone inscription stands as a testimony to this fact. Most noteworthy feature of the shrine is that the temple has a shrine dedicated to Lord Sani; the shrine of Sani is considered to be next to that of Thirunallar. Traditionally, all the temples visited by Sage Agastya are known as Agastheeswaram. It is said that the temple was visited by Sage Agastya; hence the name Agastheeswarar Temple. Mahashivaratri, Karthikai Deepam, Sani Peyarchi and Guru Peyarchi are the major festivals celebrated amid much pomp and splendour. Thousands of devotees visit the shrine every year.

 Arulmigu Pidari Kalliyamman Temple 
 Arulmigu Pidari Sri Devi Ganga Bhavani Shakthi peedam. Thangal.
 Arulmigu Perariyamman Temple
 Arulmigu Rama Anjaneyar Temple
 Arulmigu Vishnu Vinayagar Temple
 Agastheeswarar Temple (North Thirunallaaru)
 Kalli Amman Temple
 Arulmigu Hayagrevar Temple
 Famous Sai Baba Temple

Church

Pozhichalur Punitha Annai Church is dedicated to Mother Mary of Velankanni and well known called as "Pozhichalur Punitha Arokia Annai" or "Our Lady of Health - Pozhichalur". The church has attracted many din and around Pozhichalur, Pammal, Pallavaram and also from other parts of Chennai. The church is renowned for many miracles especially for married couple who is expecting for their child.

The church was run by Fathers of Precious Blood Missionaries. The parish comprised nearly 450 families and came under the Diocese of Chingleput.

Festival
Pozhichalur Punitha Arokia Annai festival is celebrated every year from 29 August to 8 September. On 29 August a flag hoisting ceremony marks the beginning of the festival. Novena Mass is conducted in Tamil at 6.30 pm every day in the evening during the festival season along with rosary and novena prayers. On 8 September, the chariot procession starts with three chariots of St Michael, St Joseph and Pozhichalur Punitha Arokia Annai. At the end of chariots possession Eucharist Blessing the lowering of the flag happens on the same day to mark the end of the festival.

Landmark: Near Polichalur Bus Terminus

Mosque
Pozhichalur Mosque is dedicated to Muslim Brothers of the localities. The mosque has attracted many devotees in and around Pozhichalur and Pammal. It is the oldest mosque since 1984. It is popularly called "Masjid-e-Munawar". It is located near Pozhichalur Water Tank.

Activities and services

Sports
Kabaddi
Cricket
Football
Volleyball

Banks and ATMs
 Indian Overseas Bank
 Tamil Nadu grama bank
 State Bank of Hyderabad
 City Union Bank
 State Bank of India
 Karur Vysya Bank
 ICICI Bank
 Muthoot Finance
 Axis Bank
 Bank of India
 India ATM

Hospitals
 Govt Hospital
 Thayu Pain & Fitness Clinic Dr K Thayumanavan, BPT, MS, [Neuro-Science] MBA, FSS, IASM, CPC
 Dhanam Nursing Home
 Das Hospitals

Schools
There are many schools like Sri Sarada Eashwar Vidya Mandir, Marya Nivas.
 Annai Vailankanni Matriculation Hr. Sec. School
 Bright Minds Crescent Pre-School
 Marya Nivas Matriculation School
 Sri Sarada Eashwar Vidya Mandir Mat Hr Sec School
 Sri Shankara Vidyalaya
 Selva Vignesh Matriculation School
 Panchayat Union Middle School (Chitlapakkam Panchayat Union - Rural)
 Adi Dravidar Welfare School
 JKM Matriculation School
 Janice Typewriting Institute
 Kidzee Pre-School

Nearest places
Chennai Airport
 
 Pammal
Anakaputhur
 Pallavaram
Cowl Bazar
 Chrompet
 Tambaram
 Selaiyur
 Kundrathur
Mangadu
 Porur
 Mudichur

Transport
Public transportation is in a developing state. Only two buses for the Parry's route are operating, but buses for Chromepet route operate frequently. One can get a bus to reach Pallavaram once in 5 minutes, and there is more than sufficient share-autos (general auto converted into share-auto) operating for commute.

52 and 60G for Parry's route, M1P for Thiruvanmiyur via Velachery and M52, M52B, 52S S81 (Small bus) etc. for Chromepet route operating. 52 G from Gowl bazaar to Broadway and Guduvancherry run through Polichalur border.

Airport expansion
The previous AIADMK regime (2001–06) government had allotted 2,000 acres of land free for the AAI to carry out the expansion by taking lands from residents of Pozhichalur, Pammal and Anakaputhur. Under pressure from the opposition parties such as CPM, DMK, PMK, and MDMK, the government later decided to drop land acquisition in the said areas and identified alternative land at Manapakkam, Tharapakkam, Kolapakkam and Gerugambakkam.

References

 Ambedkar street vinayaga nagar genral e-savai maiyam and water can supply

External links

Cities and towns in Chengalpattu district
Suburbs of Chennai
Populated places established in the 9th century